The SHARK Conference was a high school conference in north central Illinois and south central Wisconsin. The conference participated in athletics and activities in the Illinois High School Association (IHSA) and the Wisconsin Interscholastic Athletic Association (WIAA). The conference included private and public high schools with enrollments between 75-2,000 students in Boone, DeKalb, Lee, McHenry, Stephenson and Winnebago counties in Illinois and Rock in Wisconsin.

History
The name SHARK is an acronym representing the first letter of its 5 charter members. (South Beloit, Harlem, Aquin, Rockton Hononegah and Kirkland-Hiawatha) The SHARK originated as a collection of schools in northern Illinois based primarily on proximity and not on enrollment. By 1953, Kirkland-Hiawatha left the conference and was replaced with Harvard and Marengo, taking the total number of teams to six. In 1955 Freeport Aquin left the conference, however Rockford St. Thomas High School took their place. The conference continued to morph as the 1950s came to a close with North Boone High School joining in 1957 and Richmond-Burton in 1958. Also in 1958, based on the completion of Boylan Catholic High School, St. Thomas dropped out of the conference as their students began transitioning toward a new high school, and Harlem left the league in order to join the Big 8 Conference with the intent of playing competition with similar enrollments.

As the 1960s began, Alden-Hebron High School joined, however, it quickly left in 1964 along with Richmond-Burton. The following season, Winnebago High School and two Beloit, Wisconsin schools joined the conference. The two schools from Wisconsin included; Beloit Catholic High School and Turner High School. Winnebago remained a member of the league until 1972 but left for the Mid Northern Conference. Amboy High School quickly replaced them in 1972, but left after the 1975 season, heading to the newly formed Three Rivers Conference. In 1978, Johnsburg High School joined the league and in 1981, the conference's final season, Woodstock Marian would be added. However, North Boone, Beloit Catholic, and South Beloit all left the conference before the start of the season, leaving the conference with only five teams in its final season.

All-Time Membership
The SHARK Conference had various teams throughout its history, this list of schools encompasses all of the schools which were once a part of the conference.

*Beloit Catholic High School would close in 2000.
**St. Thomas Catholic High School would close in 1962.
Sources:IHSA Conferences, IHSA Coop Teams, and IHSA Member Schools Directory

Membership timeline

References

External links

High school sports in Illinois
Illinois high school sports conferences